Garrawalt is a rural locality in the Shire of Hinchinbrook, Queensland, Australia.

Geography 
The locality is loosely bounded to the north by the Herbert River, which separates the mountainous terrain of the locality from the flat sugarcane farming areas of Abergowrie to the north.

Garrawalt has the following mountains:

 The Pinnacles in the north of the locality, rising to  
Most of the locality is within the Girringun National Park except for some small areas adjacent to the Herbert River which are flatter lower land ( above sea level) using for farming.

History 
The locality was named and bounded on 27 April 2001.

Education 
There are no schools in Girrawalt. The nearest government primary school is Abergowrie State School in neighbouring Abergowrie to the north. The nearest government secondary school is Ingham State High School in Ingham to the south-east.

References 

Shire of Hinchinbrook
Localities in Queensland